Ghoutia Karchouni (born 29 May 1995) is a French professional footballer who plays as a midfielder for Italian Serie A club Inter Milan. She previously played for Paris Saint-Germain, Boston Breakers and Bordeaux. Karchouni has represented France on the U-17 and U-19 national teams.

References

External links
 
 
 
 
 Paris Saint-Germain player profile

1995 births
Living people
Footballers from Lyon
French women's footballers
Women's association football midfielders
Boston Breakers players
Paris Saint-Germain Féminine players
FC Girondins de Bordeaux (women) players
Inter Milan (women) players
National Women's Soccer League players
Division 1 Féminine players
Serie A (women's football) players
French expatriate women's footballers
French expatriate sportspeople in the United States
Expatriate women's soccer players in the United States
French expatriate sportspeople in Italy
Expatriate women's footballers in Italy
French people of North African descent